This is a list of Estonian television related events from 1993.

Events
 1 August – television channel EVTV started as an independent television channel.

Debuts

Television shows

Ending this year

Births

Deaths

See also
1993 in Estonia

References

1990s in Estonian television